Hörður Ingi Gunnarsson (born 14 August 1998) is an Icelandic footballer who plays as a left-back for Sogndal and the Iceland national team.

Career
Gunnarsson made his international debut for Iceland on 29 May 2021 in a friendly match against Mexico in Arlington, Texas.

Career statistics

International

References

External links
 
 

1998 births
Living people
Hordur Ingi Gunnarsson
Hordur Ingi Gunnarsson
Hordur Ingi Gunnarsson
Hordur Ingi Gunnarsson
Hordur Ingi Gunnarsson
Association football fullbacks
Hordur Ingi Gunnarsson
Hordur Ingi Gunnarsson
Hordur Ingi Gunnarsson
Hordur Ingi Gunnarsson
Hordur Ingi Gunnarsson
Hordur Ingi Gunnarsson